Kevin Joseph Campbell (born 4 February 1970) is an English former professional footballer, sports television pundit and co-commentator.

He was a striker, who featured in the Premier League for Arsenal, Nottingham Forest, Everton and West Bromwich Albion. He also played in the Turkish Süper Lig for Trabzonspor, and in the Football League for Leyton Orient, Leicester City and Cardiff City. He was capped four times by England U21, scoring once and received a call-up to the England B in 1991 where he earned one cap.

Club career

Arsenal
Campbell began his career as a trainee with Arsenal, joining the club on schoolboy forms in 1985. He was prolific for Arsenal's Academy, scoring 59 goals in one season. Campbell also won the FA Youth Cup of 1988 with Arsenal. He went on to make his first-team debut against Everton on 7 May 1988, although the club's forward positions at the time were usually taken by Paul Merson and Alan Smith.

Campbell came to prominence during a loan spell at Leyton Orient in 1989 when he scored 9 goals in 16 games. Campbell helped see the club to promotion during that season but didn't play in their victorious playoff final against Wrexham as his loan spell had just ended. Orient manager Frank Clark wanted to make the move permanent but Arsenal refused to sell. After a poor start to the 1989–90 season he was again loaned out, this time to Leicester City. However, in the following season he established himself in the Arsenal team, scoring eight times in ten matches during the run-in to the club's First Division title win.

Despite Arsenal signing Ian Wright in September 1991, Campbell continued to feature for Arsenal, although he was often in the shadow of his more prolific partner. Nevertheless, he scored several crucial goals for Arsenal such as equalisers against Millwall and Derby County in Arsenal's victorious 1992–93 campaigns in the FA Cup and League Cup. In the 1993–94 season, he scored 19 goals, his best for the Gunners. He also featured in the victorious 1993–94 European Cup Winners' Cup campaign, scoring four goals, including one in the semi-final against Paris Saint-Germain. His form for the club waned in 1994–95, and the arrivals of forwards John Hartson and Dennis Bergkamp saw his playing time reduced. In all, Campbell played 224 times for Arsenal, scoring 60 goals.

Nottingham Forest
In the summer of 1995, Campbell was sold to Nottingham Forest for an initial fee of £2.5million, where he spent three seasons. He was part of the team that was relegated in 1997, but his 23 goals the following season helped see the Reds win the Football League Championship of 1998.

Trabzonspor
However, Campbell controversially left Forest at the end of that season to join Turkish side Trabzonspor for £2.5million, a move which caused Forest teammate Pierre van Hooijdonk to famously go "on strike". His time in Trabzon saw him leave the club in seven months after a misunderstood racist incident which involved club president, Mehmet Ali Yılmaz calling him a "cannibal". Campbell and his teammates also had not been paid, something which he demanded they rectify. To show solidarity with Campbell, the two club captains, Ogün Temizkanoğlu and Abdullah Ercan, were at his side during a press conference in which he stated his reasons for leaving the club.

Everton
Everton, who were battling against relegation from the Premier League, signed Campbell on loan in March 1999. His impact on the side was immediate as he scored nine goals in his first eight games. These feats made him Everton's top goalscorer both at home and away from Goodison Park for that season. Campbell thus almost single-handedly saved the club from being relegated from the Premier League. His six goals of which were scored in his first three games earned him Everton's player of the month award for April, making him the first loanee to be bestowed with the title.

Campbell's move to Everton was made permanent in the summer of 1999 for a fee of £3million. In the 1999–2000 season, he scored Everton's winning goal in the Merseyside derby against Liverpool at Anfield, which was Everton's last win at Anfield before 2021, when Everton defeated Liverpool 2–0. He ended the season as the club's top scorer, with 12 goals scored altogether.

He was Everton's leading goalscorer for the following season, but only scored four times during the 2001–02 league campaign, a season in which Campbell was Everton captain. Campbell was once again the Toffees' top scorer during the subsequent season. After that, injuries limited his appearances for the club and he left in 2005.

Campbell is Everton's fourth highest Premier League goal scorer, behind Romelu Lukaku, Duncan Ferguson and Tim Cahill, and their first ever black captain.

West Bromwich Albion
Campbell moved to West Bromwich Albion in January 2005 on a free transfer and helped the club retain its Premiership status. This endeavour marked the first time that a club that had been at the bottom of the league on Christmas Day had gone on to avoid relegation.

Cardiff City
In May 2006, after West Brom were eventually relegated to the Championship, Campbell was released by the club. He signed for Cardiff City on a free transfer on 2 August 2006. He scored in an FAW Premier Cup quarter-final match away at Carmarthen Town for Cardiff, on 13 February 2007. He also appeared, in February 2007, for City against former club West Brom. He was then released by the club in May 2007 thus bringing to an end his footballing days.

International career
Campbell earned four caps for the England U-21s and one for England B. He holds the record of being the English player who has scored the most goals in the Premier League without earning a senior cap for his country. In September 1992 he was on stand-by for a friendly against Spain, but this was the nearest he got to being in the senior squad.

Media career
Campbell was featured on the Sky Sports series Where are They Now? in 2008, when he was the co-owner of security company T1 Protection, specialising in supplying bodyguards to celebrities and other wealthy customers whilst travelling abroad. He also worked with Asia-based Sony TEN as a commentator for their Premier League and Champions League coverage.

Personal life
Campbell ran a record label, 2 Wikid, with the label's first signing being rapper Mark Morrison, who had previously topped the charts with "Return of the Mack" in 1996. But in December 2004, with the artist still signed to 2 Wikid, Campbell was forced to obtain a court injunction against rival label Jet Star, in order to prevent it from releasing Morrison's album Innocent Man. The injunction was lifted shortly afterwards The first single released by 2 Wikid was that of Panjabi MC's tune "Backstabbers", a remix of Morrison's original song, which had been released in 2004.

Campbell is an avid fan of former clubs Everton F.C and Arsenal F.C.

His son Tyrese Campbell is also a footballer who plays with Stoke City

Career statistics

Honours
Arsenal Youth
FA Youth Cup: 1987–88

Arsenal
Football League First Division: 1990–91
FA Cup: 1992–93
Football League Cup: 1992–93
FA Charity Shield: 1991 (shared)
European Cup Winners' Cup: 1993–94

Nottingham Forest
Football League First Division: 1997–98

Individual
Premier League Player of the Month: April 1999

References

External links

1970 births
Living people
Footballers from Lambeth
Association football forwards
English footballers
Black British sportsmen
English expatriate footballers
England under-21 international footballers
England B international footballers
Premier League players
English Football League players
Arsenal F.C. players
Cardiff City F.C. players
Everton F.C. players
Leicester City F.C. players
Leyton Orient F.C. players
Nottingham Forest F.C. players
Trabzonspor footballers
West Bromwich Albion F.C. players
Süper Lig players
Expatriate footballers in Turkey
FA Cup Final players